Theodor Siebs (26 August 1862 – 28 May 1941) was a German linguist most remembered today as the author of Deutsche Bühnenaussprache ("German stage pronunciation"), published in 1898. The work was largely responsible for setting the standard pronunciation of the modern German language and is referred to popularly by German speakers as der Siebs ("the Siebs").

Siebs was born in Bremen, Germany on 26 August 1862. Siebs studied linguistics and classical philology in Tübingen and later was a professor both at the University of Greifswald and the University of Breslau. His writings on language and languages are varied, but there is an emphasis on the history and state of Frisian languages. His Deutsche Bühnenaussprache is still relevant, though, for practical purposes it has largely been supplanted by other works that employ the IPA (International Phonetic Alphabet), which Siebs' work did not.

Siebs died on 28 May 1941 in Breslau, Germany (now Wrocław, Poland).

See also 
 Bühnendeutsch

References

Sources 
 Literature by and about Theodor Siebs in the German National Library
A thorough German-language bibliography on the German Wikipedia page for Siebs

1862 births
1941 deaths
Academic staff of the University of Wrocław
Linguists from Germany
Germanic studies scholars
Linguists of Germanic languages
Writers from Bremen
Academic staff of the University of Greifswald